Choi In-Young (born 5 March 1962) is a former South Korean football player who played as a goalkeeper.

He played mostly for Ulsan Hyundai Horang-i. He participated for South Korea national football team at two editions of FIFA World Cup in 1990 and 1994.

Playing career 
He played in South Korea for Seoul City (1981–1983) on an amateur basis, Kookmin Bank FC (1983) and Ulsan Hyundai Horang-i (1984–1996).

Coaching career 
He was goalkeeper coach at Ulsan Hyundai Horang-i (1997–2003), Kyungil University (2005) and Jeonbuk Hyundai Motors (2006–2013).

Career statistics

International clean sheets
Results list South Korea's goal tally first.

Honours

Club
Ulsan Hyundai
K League 1: 1996
Korean League Cup: 1986, 1995

International
South Korea
Dynasty Cup: 1990

External links
 K-League Player Record 
 FIFA Player Statistics
 

1962 births
Living people
Association football goalkeepers
South Korean footballers
South Korea international footballers
Ulsan Hyundai FC players
K League 1 players
1984 AFC Asian Cup players
1990 FIFA World Cup players
1994 FIFA World Cup players
Place of birth missing (living people)
Asian Games medalists in football
Footballers at the 1990 Asian Games

Asian Games bronze medalists for South Korea
Medalists at the 1990 Asian Games
20th-century South Korean people